Palomino is a horse color.

Palomino may also refer to:

Arts and entertainment
 Palomino (film), a 1991 TV movie starring Lindsay Frost
 Palomino Blonde (a.k.a. Omega-minus), a 1975 spy fiction novel by Ted Allbeury
 Palomino (novel), a 1980 novel by Elizabeth Jolley
 Danielle Steel's 'Palomino', a 1991 American made-for-TV film based on a 1981 novel by Danielle Steel
 USS Palomino, a fictional spaceship in the 1979 Disney movie The Black Hole

Music
 Palomino (Trampled by Turtles album), 2010
 Palomino (Miranda Lambert album), 2022
 Palomino (First Aid Kit album), 2022
 "Palomino" (song), a song by Gemma Hayes
 "Palomino", a 1988 song by Duran Duran from Big Thing
 Los Palominos, a tejano group

Biology
 Palomino rabbit
 Palomino trout, a golden color variant of rainbow trout
 Palomino (grape), a breed of grape

Places
 Palomino, Colombia, a small town in Colombia South America
 Palomino Club (Las Vegas), a strip club in Las Vegas, Nevada
 Palomino Club (North Hollywood), an influential country music venue in Los Angeles, California
 Palomino Islands (Peru)
 Isla Palominos (Puerto Rico), near Fajardo

People
 Antonio Palomino (1653–1726), Spanish painter and writer
 Carlos Palomino (born 1949), Mexican boxer
 Jairo Palomino (born 1988), Colombian footballer
 José Luis Palomino (born 1990), Argentine footballer
 Luis Palomino (born 1980), Peruvian mixed martial arts fighter
 Rosa Palomino, Aymara Indigenous leader in Peru

Other uses
 A mountain bike by Klein Bikes
 The initial core of AMD's Athlon XP processor

See also